Delaware Mountain Wind Farm is a wind farm located in the Delaware Mountains of Culberson County, Texas. The farm consists of thirty-eight EWC Zond Z-48 750 kilowatt wind turbines that produce up to 28.5 megawatts of electricity. All electricity produced by the project is purchased by the Lower Colorado River Authority. The project was completed in 1999 by Orion Energy LLC and National Wind Power. NextEra Energy Resources now owns and operates the wind farm. As a result of damage to the wind farm and transmission infrastructure by an ice storm in November 2013, the Delaware Mountain Wind Farm and the adjacent Wind Power Partners 94 wind farm have been off-line. NextEra has informed the ERCOT, Electric Reliability Council of Texas, that it is dismantling the farms and "... they will be decommissioned and retired on 7 August 2014."

References

Energy infrastructure completed in 1991
Wind farms in Texas
Buildings and structures in Culberson County, Texas
1991 establishments in Texas
NextEra Energy